Wobbly lingo is a collection of technical language, jargon, and historic slang used by the Industrial Workers of the World, known as the Wobblies, for more than a century.  Many Wobbly terms derive from or are coextensive with hobo expressions used through the 1940s.

Origin and usage
Words and phrases in Wobbly lingo may have different meanings in different contexts or in different geographic areas. The "lingo" developed from the specific needs of the organization as well as the experiences of working-class people. For several decades, many hobos in the United States were members of, or were sympathetic to, the Industrial Workers of the World (IWW). Because of this, some of the terms describe the life of a hobo such as "riding the rails", living in "jungles", dodging the "bulls". The IWW's efforts to organize all trades allowed the lingo to expand to include terms relating to mining camps, timber work, and farming. Other derivations of Wobbly lingo come from a confluence of Native American languages, immigrant languages, and jargon. These meanings may vary over time.

Some words and phrases believed to have originated within Wobbly lingo have gained cultural significance outside of the IWW. For example, from Joe Hill's song "The Preacher and the Slave", the expression pie in the sky has passed into common usage, referring to a "preposterously optimistic goal."

Glossary

A

B

See Sab cat

C

D

E

F

G

H

I

J

K

L

M

N

O

P

R

S

T

U

V

W

Y

See also

The use of slang is a means of recognising members of the same group, and to differentiate that group from society at large, while the use of jargon relates to a specific activity, profession, or group.
Slang terms are frequently particular to a certain subculture.
Chinook jargon, especially for northwest timber country usage.
Shibboleth

Notes

References

Further reading
Nelson, Eugene; Break Their Haughty Power: Joe Murphy in the Heyday of the Wobblies, glossary pages 12i-15i.

+
Lists of slang
Wobbly
Wikipedia glossaries using description lists